Apharia or Aphariya may refer to:

 Aphariya or Aphariyas, is a clan of Yaduvanshi Ahir caste in India
 Apharia, is a genus of fungi within the class Sordariomycetes
 Afareyanaj, is a village in Ab Barik Rural District, in the Central District of Sonqor County, Kermanshah Province, Iran
 Aphareus, a character in Greek mythology
 Apaharan, a Hindi movie
 Aphareus (writer), a Greek writer.

See also